Di goldene keit ("The Golden Chain") was the leading Yiddish-language literary journal of the post-World War II era. Founded in 1949 by Avrom Sutzkever, it continued publication under his editorship until 1995. Published in Tel Aviv, Israel, it was initially sponsored by the Histadrut, one of the few Yiddish-language Israeli publications ever to have significant institutional support: the Israeli government strongly promoted the Hebrew language and was not generally friendly to the Yiddish language.

Notes

Yiddish culture in Tel Aviv
Yiddish-language magazines
Defunct magazines published in Israel
Literary magazines published in Israel
Magazines established in 1949
Magazines disestablished in 1995
Mass media in Tel Aviv